Enrique Labadie (born 14 November 1944) is a Mexican sprinter. He competed in the men's 4 × 100 metres relay at the 1968 Summer Olympics.

References

External links
 

1944 births
Living people
Athletes (track and field) at the 1968 Summer Olympics
Mexican male sprinters
Olympic athletes of Mexico
Athletes from Mexico City
20th-century Mexican people